Ebersdorf may refer to the following places:
Ebersdorf bei Coburg, in the district of Coburg, Bavaria, Germany
Ebersdorf, Lower Saxony, in the district of Rotenburg, Lower Saxony, Germany
Ebersdorf, Saalburg-Ebersdorf, a village in the town of Saalburg-Ebersdorf, Thuringia, Germany
Ebersdorf, Austria, in the district of Hartberg, Styria, Austria

See also 
, a former municipality, since 1982 a district of Vienna, Austria
, which has served at various times as a fortress, a Habsburg hunting lodge, and a prison